The Blood Stained Route Map is a 2004 North Korean film directed by Phyo Kwang. Set during the Goryeo period, the film tells the story of a family who fight together to protect the Dokdo islets (Liancourt Rocks) against Japanese invaders.

Plot
The Blood Stained Route Map received its South Korean premiere in 2005, where it was one of three North Korean films shown at the Special Screening section of the Jeonju International Film Festival, held from 28 April–6 May. Hwang Kyun-min, coordinator of the section, regarded the screening as being "timely since the issue of [Dokdo] is very controversial now." It later became the first North Korean film to be screened at the outdoor plaza in front of Seoul City Hall, when it was shown on 1 July 2005 as part of the buildup to the Daejong Film Festival.

References

External links
 

2004 films
2000s historical films
2000s Korean-language films
North Korean drama films
Films set in the 14th century
Anti-Japanese sentiment in Korea
Films set in the Goryeo Dynasty